The 2008 Asian Cycling Championships took place at the Nara Keirin Velodrome, Nara, Japan from 10 to 17 April 2008.

Medal summary

Road

Men

Women

Track

Men

Women

Medal table

References

External links
 Official website

Asia
Asia
Cycling
Asian Cycling Championships
International cycle races hosted by Japan